The History of Sarawak can be traced as far as 40,000 years ago to the paleolithic period where the earliest evidence of human settlement is found in the Niah caves. A series of Chinese ceramics dated from the 8th to 13th century AD was uncovered at the archeological site of Santubong. The coastal regions of Sarawak came under the influence of the Bruneian Empire in the 16th century. In 1839, James Brooke, a British explorer, first arrived in Sarawak. Sarawak was later governed by the Brooke family between 1841 and 1946. During World War II, it was occupied by the Japanese for three years. After the war, the last White Rajah, Charles Vyner Brooke, ceded Sarawak to Britain, and in 1946 it became a British Crown Colony. On 22 July 1963, Sarawak was granted self-government by the British. Following this, it became one of the founding members of the Federation of Malaysia, established on 16 September 1963. However, the federation was opposed by Indonesia, and this led to the three-year Indonesia–Malaysia confrontation. From 1960 to 1990, Sarawak experienced a communist insurgency.

Prehistory 

The landscape around the Niah Caves was drier and more exposed than it is now. Prehistorically, the Niah Caves were surrounded by a combination of closed forests with bush, parkland, swamps, and rivers. The foragers were able to survive in the rainforest through hunting, fishing, and gathering molluscs and edible plants. This new timeline of 65,000 years was established when five pieces of microlithic tools that were aged 65,000 years old and a human skull that was aged 55,000 years were discovered at part of the Niah Caves complex, Trader cave, during excavation work. An earlier evidence is the discovery of a modern human skull, nicknamed "Deep Skull", in a deep trench uncovered by Barbara and Tom Harrisson (a British ethnologist) in 1958; this is also the oldest modern human skull in Southeast Asia. The Deep Skull probably belongs to a 16- to 17-year-old adolescent girl. When compared with the Iban skull and other fossils, the Deep Skull most closely resembles the indigenous people of Borneo today, with their delicate features and small body size, and it has few similarities with the skulls of the indigenous Australians. Mesolithic and Neolithic burial sites have also been found. The area around the Niah Caves has been designated the Niah National Park.

Another earlier excavation by Tom Harrisson in 1949 unearthed a series of Chinese ceramics at Santubong (near Kuching) that date to the Tang and the Song dynasties in the 8th to 19th century AD. It is possible that Santubong was an important seaport in Sarawak during the period, but its importance declined during the Yuan dynasty, and the port was deserted during the Ming dynasty. Other archaeological sites in Sarawak can be found inside the Kapit, Song, Serian, and Bau districts.

Malano Kingdom
The Melano kingdom existed from about 1300 to 1400 AD and centred at the Mukah river. Rajah Tugau is the most renowned King in Sarawak as of now. His kingdom consisted of groups of similar Melanau and Kajang language speakers and covered coastal Sarawak until Belait. They also share almost identical culture and heritage. According to the manuscript of Brunei's rulers, following the fall of Majapahit, Barunai led by Awang Semaun being reinforced by the Iban, conquered Tutong under its chief Mawanga and the whole of the Melano kingdom until Igan under its chief Basiung despite reinforcement from Sambas. Barunai continued the conquest of the entire south and then north of Borneo Island, after which conquered the whole Sulu and Philippines. Nagarakertagama, written in 1365 during Hayam Wuruk, mentions Malano and Barune(ng) among the 14 tributaries of Majapahit. After the fall of Majapahit, Barune(ng) expanded its territory along the northern coast of Borneo island. The Catalan Atlas published in 1375 shows the map of the Malano kingdom. This was confirmed by a Portuguese map which shows the existence of a polity called Malano. At Florence, Italy, an old map dated 1595 shows the Sarawak coastal areas as districts of Oya, Balingian dan Mukah which was marked as Malano. In the Nan-hai-chih of China mentioned Achen atau Igan. According to Historian Robert Nicholl, Rajah Tugau of the Melanao was the Rajah Makatunao mentioned in the Philippine History book of Maragtas to which the 10 Datus of the Kedatuan of Madja-as in Panay Island, waged a war against, it is through the Melano that Visayans have further links with the Srivijayans in Vijayapura (The Srivijayan vassal-state in Borneo) before the conquest of Majapahit.

Bruneian Empire and the Sultanate of Sarawak

During the 16th century, the Kuching area was known to Portuguese cartographers as Cerava, one of the five great seaports on the island of Borneo. During its golden age, Brunei under Nahkhod Raga Sultan Bolkiah (1473-1521 AD) managed to conquer the Santubong Kingdom in 1512. For a short period of time, it was self-governed under the Sultan of Brunei's younger brother, Sultan Tengah in 1599. The new Sultan's younger brother, Pengiran Muda Tengah, also wanted to become Sultan of Brunei by claiming himself rightful successor on the basis of having been born when his father became the Crown Prince. Sultan Abdul Jalilul Akbar responded by proclaiming Pengiran Muda Tengah as Sultan of Sarawak, as at that time Sarawak was a territory administered by Brunei. Sultan Tengah was killed at Batu Buaya in 1641 by one of his followers. He was buried in Kampong Batu Buaya. With his death, the Sultanate of Sarawak came to an end and later consolidated into Brunei once more. By the early 19th century, Sarawak had become a loosely governed territory under the control of the Brunei Sultanate. The Bruneian Empire had authority only along the coastal regions of Sarawak held by semi-independent Malay leaders. Meanwhile, the interior of Sarawak suffered from tribal wars fought by Iban, Kayan, and Kenyah peoples, who aggressively fought to expand their territories.

Following the discovery of antimony ore in the Kuching region, Pangeran Indera Mahkota (a representative of the Sultan of Brunei) began to develop the territory between 1824 and 1830. When antimony production increased, the Brunei Sultanate demanded higher taxes from Sarawak; this led to civil unrest and chaos. In 1839, Sultan Omar Ali Saifuddin II (1827–1852), ordered his uncle  to restore order. Pangeran Muda Hashim requested the assistance of British sailor James Brooke in the matter, but Brooke refused. However, in 1841 during his next visit to Sarawak in 1841 he agreed to a repeated request. Pangeran Muda Hashim signed a treaty in 1841 surrendering Sarawak to Brooke. On 24 September 1841, Pangeran Muda Hashim bestowed the title of governor on James Brooke. This appointment was later confirmed by the Sultan of Brunei in 1842. In 1843, James Brooke decided to create a pro-British Brunei government by installing Pangeran Muda Hashim into the Brunei Court as he would take Brooke's advice, forcing Brunei to appoint Hashim under the guns of East India Company's steamer Phlegethon. The Brunei Court was unhappy with Hashim's appointment and had him assassinated in 1845. In retaliation, James Brooke attacked Kampong Ayer, the capital of Brunei. After the incident, the Sultan of Brunei sent an apology letter to Queen Victoria. The sultan also confirmed James Brooke's possession of Sarawak and his mining rights of antimony without paying tribute to Brunei. In 1846 Brooke effectively became the Rajah of Sarawak and founded the White Rajah Dynasty of Sarawak.

Brooke dynasty 

James Brooke ruled the area and expanded the territory northwards until his death in 1868. He was succeeded by his nephew Charles Anthoni Johnson Brooke, who in turn was succeeded by his son, Charles Vyner Brooke, on the condition that Charles Anthoni should rule in consultation with Vyner Brooke's brother Bertram Brooke. Both James and Charles Anthoni Johnson Brooke pressured Brunei to sign treaties as a strategy to acquire territories from Brunei and expand the territorial boundaries of Sarawak. In 1861, Brunei ceded the Bintulu region to James Brooke. Sarawak was recognised as an independent state by the United States in 1850 and the United Kingdom in 1864. The state issued its first currency as the Sarawak dollar in 1858. In 1883 Sarawak was extended to the Baram River (near Miri). Limbang was added to Sarawak in 1890. The final expansion of Sarawak occurred in 1905 when Lawas was ceded to the Brooke government. Sarawak was divided into five divisions, corresponding to territorial boundaries of the areas acquired by the Brookes through the years. Each division was headed by a Resident.

Sarawak became a British protectorate in 1888, while still ruled by the Brooke dynasty. The Brookes ruled Sarawak for a hundred years as "White Rajahs". The Brookes adopted a policy of paternalism to protect the interests of the indigenous population and their overall welfare. While the Brooke government established a Supreme Council consisting of Malay chiefs who advised the Rajahs on all aspects of governance, in the Malaysian context the Brooke family is viewed as a colonialist. The Supreme Council is the oldest state legislative assembly in Malaysia, with the first General Council meeting taking place at Bintulu in 1867. Meanwhile, the Ibans and other Dayak people were hired as militia. The Brooke dynasty encouraged the immigration of Chinese merchants for economic development, especially in the mining and agricultural sectors. Western businessmen were restricted from entering the state while Christian missionaries were tolerated. Piracy, slavery, and headhunting were banned. Borneo Company Limited was formed in 1856. It was involved in a wide range of businesses in Sarawak such as trade, banking, agriculture, mineral exploration, and development.

In 1857, 500 Hakka Chinese gold miners from Bau, under the leadership of Liu Shan Bang, destroyed the Brookes' house. Brooke escaped and organised a bigger army together with his nephew Charles and his Malayo-Iban supporters. A few days later, Brooke's army was able to cut off the escape route of the Chinese rebels, who were defeated after two months of fighting. The Brookes subsequently built a new government house by the Sarawak River at Kuching. An anti-Brooke faction at the Brunei Court was defeated in 1860 at Mukah. Other notable rebellions that were successfully quashed by the Brookes include those led by an Iban leader Rentap (18531863), and a Malay leader named Syarif Masahor (18601862). As a result, a series of forts were built around Kuching to consolidate the Rajah's power. These include Fort Margherita, which was completed in 1879. In 1891 Charles Anthoni Brooke established the Sarawak Museum, the oldest museum in Borneo. In 1899, Charles Anthoni Brooke ended the intertribal wars in Marudi. The first oil well was drilled in 1910. Two years later, the Brooke Dockyard opened. Anthony Brooke was born in the same year and became Rajah Muda in 1939.

In 1941, during the centenary celebration of Brooke rule in Sarawak, a new constitution was introduced to limit the power of the Rajah and to allow the Sarawak people to play a greater role in the functioning of the government. However, the draft included a secret agreement drawn up between Charles Vyner Brooke and British government officials, in which Vyner Brooke ceded Sarawak as a British Crown Colony in return for a financial compensation to him and his family.

Japanese occupation and Allied liberation 

The Brooke government, under the leadership of Charles Vyner Brooke, established several airstrips in Kuching, Oya, Mukah, Bintulu, and Miri for preparations in the event of war. By 1941, the British had withdrawn its defending forces from Sarawak to Singapore. With Sarawak now unguarded, the Brooke regime decided to adopt a scorched earth policy where oil installations in Miri would be destroyed and the Kuching airfield will be held as long as possible before being destroyed. Meanwhile, Japanese forces seized British Borneo to guard their eastern flank in the Malayan Campaign and to facilitate their invasion of Sumatra and West Java. A Japanese invasion force led by Kiyotake Kawaguchi landed in Miri on 16 December 1941 (eight days into the Malayan Campaign) and conquered Kuching on 24 December 1941. British forces led by Lieutenant Colonel C.M. Lane retreated to Singkawang in Dutch Borneo bordering Sarawak. After ten weeks of fighting in Dutch Borneo, the Allied forces surrendered on 1 April 1942. When the Japanese invaded Sarawak, Charles Vyner Brooke had already left for Sydney, Australia, while his officers were captured by the Japanese and interned at the Batu Lintang camp.

Sarawak remained part of the Empire of Japan for three years and eight months. Sarawak, together with North Borneo and Brunei, formed a single administrative unit named Kita Boruneo (Northern Borneo) under the Japanese 37th Army headquartered in Kuching. Sarawak was divided into three provinces, namely: Kuching-shu, Sibu-shu, and Miri-shu, each under their respective Japanese Provincial Governor. The Japanese retained pre-war administrative machinery and assigned Japanese for government positions. The administration of Sarawak's interior was left to the native police and village headmen, under Japanese supervision. Though the Malays were typically receptive toward the Japanese, other indigenous tribes such as the Iban, Kayan, Kenyah, Kelabit and Lun Bawang maintained a hostile attitude toward them because of policies such as compulsory labour, forced deliveries of foodstuffs, and confiscation of firearms. The Japanese did not resort to strong measures in clamping down on the Chinese population because the Chinese in the state were generally apolitical. However, a considerable number of Chinese moved from urban areas into the less accessible interior to lessen contact with the Japanese.

Allied forces later formed the Z Special Unit to sabotage Japanese operations in Southeast Asia. Beginning in March 1945, Allied commanders were parachuted into Borneo jungles and established several bases in Sarawak under an operation codenamed "Semut". Hundreds of indigenous people were trained to launch offensives against the Japanese. During the battle of North Borneo, the Australian forces landed at Lutong-Miri area on 20 June 1945 and had penetrated as far as Marudi and Limbang before halting their operations in Sarawak. After the surrender of Japan, the Japanese surrendered to the Australian forces at Labuan on 10 September 1945. This was followed by the official surrender ceremony at Kuching aboard the Australian Corvette HMAS Kapunda on 11 September 1945. The Batu Lintang camp was liberated on the same day. Sarawak was immediately placed under British Military Administration until April 1946.

British crown colony 

After the war, the Brooke government did not have enough resources to rebuild Sarawak. Charles Vyner Brooke was also not willing to hand over his power to his heir apparent, Anthony Brooke (his nephew, the only son of Bertram Brooke) because of serious differences between them. Furthermore, Vyner Brooke's wife, Sylvia Brett, tried to defame Anthony Brooke in order to install her daughter to the throne. Faced with these problems, Vyner Brooke decided to cede sovereignty of Sarawak to the British Crown. A Cession Bill was put forth in the Council Negri (now Sarawak State Legislative Assembly) and was debated for three days. The bill was passed on 17 May 1946 with a narrow majority (19 versus 16 votes). Supporters of the bill were mostly European officers, while the Malays opposed the bill. This caused hundreds of Malay civil servants to resign in protest, sparking an anti-cession movement and the assassination of the second colonial governor of Sarawak Sir Duncan Stewart by Rosli Dhobi.

Anthony Brooke opposed the cession of Sarawak to the British Crown, and was linked to anti-cessionist groups in Sarawak, especially after the assassination of Sir Duncan Stewart. Anthony Brooke continued to claim sovereignty as Rajah of Sarawak even after Sarawak became a British Crown colony on 1 July 1946. For this he was banished from Sarawak by the colonial government and was allowed to return only 17 years later for a nostalgic visit, when Sarawak became part of Malaysia. In 1950 all anti-cession movements in Sarawak ceased after a clamp-down by the colonial government. In 1951 Anthony relinquished all his claims to the Sarawak throne after he used up his last legal avenue at the Privy Council.

Self-government and the Federation of Malaysia 

On 27 May 1961, Tunku Abdul Rahman, the prime minister of the Federation of Malaya, announced a plan to form a greater federation together with Singapore, Sarawak, Sabah and Brunei, to be called Malaysia. This plan caused the local leaders in Sarawak to be wary of Tunku's intentions in view of the great disparity in socioeconomic development between Malaya and the Borneo states. There was a general fear that without a strong political institution, the Borneo states would be subjected to Malaya's colonisation. Therefore, various political parties in Sarawak emerged to protect the interests of the communities they represented. On 17 January 1962, the Cobbold Commission was formed to gauge the support of Sarawak and Sabah for the proposed federation. Between February and April 1962, the commission met more than 4,000 people and received 2,200 memoranda from various groups. The commission reported divided support among the Borneo population. However, Tunku interpreted the figures as 80 percent support for the federation. Sarawak proposed an 18-point memorandum to safeguard its interests in the federation. In September 1962, Sarawak Council Negri (now Sarawak state legislative assembly) passed a resolution that supported the federation with a condition that the interests of the Sarawak people would not be compromised. On 23 October 1962, five political parties in Sarawak formed a united front that supported the formation of Malaysia. Sarawak was officially granted self-government on 22 July 1963, and formed the federation of Malaysia with Malaya, North Borneo, and Singapore on 16 September 1963.

The Malaysian federation had drawn opposition from the Philippines, Indonesia, Brunei People's Party, and the Sarawak-based communist groups. The Philippines and Indonesia claimed that the British would be "neocolonising" the Borneo states through the federation. Meanwhile, A. M. Azahari, leader of the Brunei People's Party, instigated the Brunei Revolt in December 1962 to prevent Brunei from joining the Malaysian federation. Azahari seized Limbang and Bekenu before being defeated by British military forces sent from Singapore. Claiming that the Brunei revolt was solid evidence of opposition to the Malaysian federation, Indonesian President Sukarno ordered a military confrontation with Malaysia, sending armed volunteers and later military forces into Sarawak, which became a flashpoint during the Indonesia–Malaysia confrontation between 1962 and 1966. The confrontation gained little support from Sarawakians except from the Sarawak communists. Thousands of communist members went into Kalimantan, Indonesian Borneo, and underwent training with the Communist Party of Indonesia. During the confrontation, around 10,000 to 150,000 British troops were stationed in Sarawak, together with Australian and New Zealand troops. When Suharto replaced Sukarno as the president of Indonesia, negotiations were restarted between Malaysia and Indonesia which led to the end of the confrontation on 11 August 1966.

After the formation of the People's Republic of China in 1949, the ideology of Maoism started to influence Chinese schools in Sarawak. The first communist group in Sarawak was formed in 1951, with its origins in the Chung Hua Middle School (Kuching). The group was succeeded by the Sarawak Liberation League (SLL) in 1954. Its activities spread from schools to trade unions and farmers. They were mainly concentrated in the southern and central regions of Sarawak. Communist members successfully penetrated the Sarawak United Peoples' Party (SUPP). SLL tried to realise a communist state in Sarawak through constitutional means but during the confrontation period, it resorted to armed struggle against the government. Weng Min Chyuan and Bong Kee Chok were the two notable leaders of the SLL. Following this, the Sarawak government relocated Chinese villagers into security-guarded settlements along the KuchingSerian road to prevent the communists from getting material support from the villagers. The North Kalimantan Communist Party (NKCP) (also known as Clandestine Communist Organisation (CCO) by government sources) was formally set up in 1970. In 1973, Bong surrendered to chief minister Abdul Rahman Ya'kub; this significantly reduced the strength of the communist party. However, Weng, who had directed the CCO from China since the mid-1960s, called for armed struggle against the government, which after 1974 continued in the Rajang Delta. In 1989 the Malayan Communist Party (MCP) signed a peace agreement with the government of Malaysia. This caused the NKCP to reopen negotiations with the Sarawak government, which led to a peace agreement on 17 October 1990. Peace was restored in Sarawak after the final group of 50 communist guerrillas laid down their arms.

Notes

References

 
History of Brunei
Raj of Sarawak